This is a list of United States Death Metal (USDM) bands that were originally formed in the United States of America. Death metal is an extreme subgenre of heavy metal music. It typically employs heavily distorted guitars, tremolo picking, deep growling vocals, blast beat drumming, minor keys or atonality, and complex song structures with multiple tempo changes.

A

 Abscess
 The Absence
 Abysmal Dawn
 Acheron
 Acid Bath
 Acid Witch
 Aletheian
 Angelcorpse
 Animosity
 Arsis
 Assück
 Atheist
 Autopsy

B

 Becoming the Archetype
 Between the Buried and Me
 Beyond the Sixth Seal
 Black Crown Initiate
 The Black Dahlia Murder
 Bloodsoaked
 Born of Osiris
 Brain Drill
 Brodequin
 Broken Hope
 Brujeria
 Brutality

C

 Caninus
 Cannibal Corpse
 Cannabis Corpse
 Capharnaum
 Cattle Decapitation
 Cephalic Carnage
 Circle of Dead Children
 Council of the Fallen
 The County Medical Examiners
 Crimson Thorn
 Cynic

D

 Dååth
 Daylight Dies
 Death
 Deus Invictus
 Deceased
 Decrepit Birth
 Deeds of Flesh
 Deicide
 Demiricous
 Dethklok
 Devourment
 Diabolic
 Dim Mak
 Disgorge
 Disincarnate
 Diskreet
 Divine Empire
 Divine Heresy
 Dr. Shrinker
 Dying Fetus

E

 Elysia
 Embalmer
 Embodyment
 Epidemic
 Epoch of Unlight
 Evoken
 Exhumed

F
 The Faceless
 From a Second Story Window
 The Funeral Pyre
 Funerus

G

 Ghoul
 Glass Casket
Goatlord
 Goatwhore
 God Forbid
 Goreaphobia
 Graves of Valor
 Guttural Secrete

H
 Hatebeak
 Hate Eternal
 Hibernus Mortis

I

 Immolation
 Impaled
 Impending Doom
 Impetigo
 Incantation
 Into the Moat

J

 Job for a Cowboy
 Jungle Rot

K
 Kaos Rising
 Killing Addiction
 Killing Moon
 Knights of the Abyss

L
Landmine Marathon

M

 Macabre
 Malevolent Creation
 Malignancy
 The Mandrake
 Massacre
 Master
 Misery Index
 Molotov Solution
 Monstrosity
 Morbid Angel
 Morgion
 Mortal Decay
 Mortician
 Mutiny Within

N

 Necare
 Necrophagia
 Nile
 Nocturnus
 Novembers Doom
 Nuclear Death

O
 Obituary
 Oblivion
 Odious Mortem
 Oppressor
 Opprobrium
 Order from Chaos
 Order of Ennead
 Origin
 Oceano

P

 Pathology
 Paths of Possession
 Pig Destroyer
 Possessed

R
 The Red Chord	
 The Red Death
 Revocation
 Ripping Corpse

S

 Sadistic Intent
 Sadus
 Sculptured
 Six Feet Under
 Skinless
 Sons of Azrael
 Soul Embraced
 Stovokor
 Success Will Write Apocalypse Across the Sky
 Suffocation

T

 Terrorizer
 Thorr's Hammer
 Through the Eyes of the Dead
 Trap Them

U

V
 Vile
 Vital Remains
 Voodoo Gods

W
 Waking the Cadaver
 Winter
 Withered
 Woe of Tyrants
 World Under Blood
 Wretched

X

Y

Z

See also
 
 List of death metal bands

References

External links

 Definition of death metal, Merriam-Webster dictionary, Quote: "a type of heavy metal music that is characterized by the use of dark, violent, or gory imagery"

Technical USDM Bands

Lists of death metal bands by region